The Edge is a studio album by Ike Turner released on Fantasy Records in 1980. The album was released two years after Turner's divorce from his musical partner Tina Turner.

Recording and release 
The Edge features songs taken from Ike & Tina Turner's recording sessions together. Tina Turner sings lead on the recordings on the Side A, which include pop-rock hits such as "Only Women Bleed" by Alice Cooper and "Philadelphia Freedom" by Elton John. The B Side contains Ike Turner singing his compositions. The promotional single "Party Vibes"/"Shame, Shame Shame" charted at No. 27 on the Billboard Disco Top 100 chart in 1980. In 1982, the cover song "Shame, Shame, Shame" was released as a single in the Netherlands, charting at No. 47.

After Tina Turner released her successful Private Dancer album, Fantasy reissued Side A of The Edge as a mini-album in 1984. The cover song, "Lean On Me" by Bill Withers" was released as a single in 1984.

Critical reception 
Reviewing the Tina Turner mini-album for Billboard, Nelson George noted that Turner's "interpretations of two Bill Withers classics 'Lean On Me' and 'Use Me,' were the stand stand out" tracks. He added that on 'Lean On Me,' Tina, with more than a little help from Ike's clever rearrangement, turns Withers' mid-tempo tribute to friendship into a frenzied gospel song."

Track listing

Chart performance

References 

1980 albums
Ike & Tina Turner albums
Ike Turner albums
Albums produced by Ike Turner